The United States Marshals Service (USMS) is a federal law enforcement agency in the United States. The USMS is a bureau within the U.S. Department of Justice, operating under the direction of the attorney general, but serves as the enforcement arm of the United States federal courts to ensure the effective operation of the judiciary and integrity of the Constitution. It is the oldest U.S. federal law enforcement agency, created by the Judiciary Act of 1789 during the presidency of George Washington as the "Office of the United States Marshal". The USMS as it stands today was established in 1969 to provide guidance and assistance to U.S. Marshals throughout the federal judicial districts.

The Marshals Service is primarily responsible for the protection of judges and other judicial personnel, the administration of fugitive operations, the management of criminal assets, the operation of the United States Federal Witness Protection Program and the Justice Prisoner and Alien Transportation System, the execution of federal arrest warrants, and the protection of senior government officials through the Office of Protective Operations. Throughout its history the Marshals have also provided unique security and enforcement services including protecting African American students enrolling in the South during the civil rights movement, escort security for United States Air Force LGM-30 Minuteman missile convoys, law enforcement for the United States Antarctic Program, and protection of the Strategic National Stockpile.

History

Origins
The office of United States Marshal was created by the First Congress. President George Washington signed the Judiciary Act into law on September 24, 1789. The Act provided that a United States Marshal's primary function was to execute all lawful warrants issued to him under the authority of the United States. The law defined marshals as officers of the courts charged with assisting federal courts in their law-enforcement functions:

Six days after signing the act into law, President Washington appointed the first thirteen U.S. Marshals, for each of the then extant federal districts. To each of his appointees for Marshal and District Attorney, the president addressed a form letter:

For over 100 years marshals were patronage jobs, typically controlled by the district judge. They were paid primarily by fees until a salary system was set up in 1896.

Many of the first U.S. Marshals had already proven themselves in military service during the American Revolutionary War. Among the first marshals were John Adams's son-in-law Congressman William Stephens Smith for the District of New York, another New York district marshal, Congressman Thomas Morris, and Henry Dearborn for the District of Maine.

From the nation's earliest days, marshals were permitted to recruit special deputies as local hires, or as temporary transfers to the Marshals Service from other federal law-enforcement agencies. Marshals were also authorized to swear in a posse to assist with manhunts, and other duties, ad hoc. Marshals were given extensive authority to support the federal courts within their judicial districts, and to carry out all lawful orders issued by federal judges, Congress, or the President. Federal marshals were by far the most important government officials in territorial jurisdictions. Local law enforcement officials were often called "marshals" so there is often an ambiguity whether someone was a federal or a local official.

Federal marshals are most famous for their law enforcement work, but that was only a minor part of their workload. The largest part of the business was paper work—serving writs (e.g., subpoenas, summonses, warrants), and other processes issued by the courts, making arrests and handling all federal prisoners. They also disbursed funds as ordered by the courts. Marshals paid the fees and expenses of the court clerks, U.S. Attorneys, jurors, and witnesses. They rented the courtrooms and jail space, and hired the bailiffs, criers, and janitors. They made sure the prisoners were present, the jurors were available, and that the witnesses were on time.

The marshals thus provided local representation for the federal government within their districts. They took the national census every decade through 1870. They distributed presidential proclamations, collected a variety of statistical information on commerce and manufacturing, supplied the names of government employees for the national register, and performed other routine tasks needed for the central government to function effectively.

19th century
During the settlement of the American frontier, marshals served as the main source of day-to-day law enforcement in areas that had no local government of their own. U.S. Marshals were instrumental in keeping law and order in the "Old West" era. They were involved in apprehending desperadoes such as Bill Doolin, Ned Christie, and in 1893, the infamous Dalton Gang after a shoot-out that left Deputy Marshals Ham Hueston, Lafe Shadley, and posse member Dick Speed, dead. Individual deputy marshals have been seen as legendary heroes in the face of rampant lawlessness (see Notable marshals below) with Wyatt Earp, Bat Masterson, Dallas Stoudenmire, and Bass Reeves as examples of well-known marshals. Bill Tilghman, Heck Thomas, and Chris Madsen formed a legendary law enforcement trio known as "Three Guardsmen" when they worked together policing the vast, lawless Oklahoma and Indian Territories.

Until its repeal in 1864, the Fugitive Slave Act of 1850 tasked marshals to accept an affidavit on its face to recover a fugitive slave.

On October 26, 1881, Deputy U.S. Marshal Virgil Earp, his brothers, Special Deputy U.S. Marshals Morgan and Wyatt Earp, and Special Deputy U.S. Marshal John "Doc" H. Holliday gunned down Frank and Tom McLaury and Billy Clanton in the legendary gunfight at the O.K. Corral in Tombstone, Arizona.

In 1894, U.S. Marshals helped suppress the Pullman Strike.

20th century
During the 1920s, U.S. Marshals enforced Prohibition.

Marshals registered enemy aliens in wartime, sealed the American border against armed expeditions from foreign countries, and at times during the Cold War also swapped spies with the Soviet Union.

In the 1960s the marshals were on the front lines of the civil rights movement, mainly providing protection to volunteers. In September 1962, President John F. Kennedy ordered 127 marshals to accompany James Meredith, an African American who wished to register at the segregated University of Mississippi. Their presence on campus provoked riots at the university, but the marshals stood their ground, and Meredith registered. Marshals provided continuous protection to Meredith during his first year at Ole Miss, and Attorney General Robert F. Kennedy later proudly displayed a deputy marshal's dented helmet in his office. U.S. Marshals also protected black school children integrating public schools in the South. Artist Norman Rockwell's famous painting The Problem We All Live With depicted a tiny Ruby Bridges being escorted by four towering United States Marshals in 1964.

Until 1965, each U.S. district court hired and administered its own marshals independently from all others. In 1965, the Executive Office for U.S. Marshals, was created as "the first organization to supervise U.S. Marshals nationwide". The United States Marshals Service, a federal agency, was created in 1969.

Since June 1975, the Marshals Service have the mission of providing law enforcement support and escort security to United States Air Force LGM-30 Minuteman and missile systems from military facilities.

In 1985, the Marshals Service partnered with local Washington, D.C. law enforcement officers to create Operation Flagship, arresting fugitives using faked free tickets to a local American football game. In 1989, the Marshals Service was given the jurisdiction over crimes committed relating to U.S. personnel in Antarctica and has been doing so ever since.

During the 1992 Los Angeles riots, 200 deputy marshals of the tactical unit Special Operations Group were dispatched to assist local and state authorities in restoring peace and order throughout Los Angeles County, California.

In the 1990s, deputy marshals protected abortion clinics.

21st century
Marshals have protected American athletes at Olympic Games, the refugee boy Elián González before his return to Cuba in 2000, and abortion clinics as required by federal law. In 2003, Marshals retrieved North Carolina's copy of the Bill of Rights.

In 2002, the Marshals Service was tasked by the Centers for Disease Control and Prevention (CDC) to provide protective security and law enforcement capabilities in the protection of the Strategic National Stockpile (SNS), such as warehouses, materiel and CDC personnel during deployment. Marshals also provide secure transportation of critical medical supplies and bio-terrorism response resources throughout the nation. Senior Inspectors of the U.S. Marshals Service SNS Security Operations (SNSSO) Program have deployed to Hurricane Katrina in 2005 and responded during the H1N1 flu pandemic in 2009. SNSSO Senior Inspectors have also staffed National Security Special Events (NSSE) with their state, local and other federal partners on a regular basis.

In 2006, the Sex Offenders Investigations Branch (SOIB) was formed on July 27 with the passage of the Adam Walsh Child Protection and Safety Act (AWA). The SOIB carries out the USMS’s three principal responsibilities under the AWA:  assist state, local, tribal and territorial authorities in the location and apprehension of non-compliant and fugitive sex offenders; investigate violations of the act for federal prosecution, and assist in the identification and location of sex offenders relocated as a result of a major disaster. To ensure the safety of communities and children across the country, the USMS has implemented an aggressive enforcement strategy for its responsibilities under the AWA. This branch apprehends sex offenders, primarily those who prey on minors. Offenders are apprehended due to failure to register, among other things.

In February 2017, Marshals began providing protective security to United States Secretary of Education Betsy DeVos, the first time since 2009 that a United States Cabinet-level official has been provided security by the Marshals.

Marshals were deployed to keep order in Washington, D.C. during the George Floyd protests on May 31, 2020, as well as during the January 6 United States Capitol attack.

Duties and responsibilities

The Marshals Service is responsible for apprehending wanted fugitives, providing protection for the federal judiciary, transporting federal prisoners, protecting endangered federal witnesses, and managing assets seized from criminal enterprises. The Marshals Service is responsible for 55.2% of arrests of federal fugitives. Between 1981 and 1985, the Marshals Service conducted Fugitive Investigative Strike Team operations to jump-start fugitive capture in specific districts. In 2012, U.S. marshals captured over 36,000 federal fugitives and cleared over 39,000 fugitive warrants.

The Marshals Service also executes all lawful writs, processes, and orders issued under the authority of the United States, and shall command all necessary assistance to execute its duties.

Historically, under Section 27 of the Judiciary Act of 1789 U.S. Marshals had the common law-based power to enlist any willing civilians as deputies for necessary assistance in the execution of their duties. In the Old West this was known as forming a posse, although under the Posse Comitatus Act, they could not use military troops in uniform representing their unit or the military service for law enforcement duties. However, if a service member was off duty, wearing civilian clothing, and willing to assist a law enforcement officer on their own behalf, it was acceptable. In contemporary times, the deputation of a civilian would be extraordinarily unusual. However, the Director of the United States Marshals Service currently has the statutory authority to deputize (for one year) selected officers of the United States Department of Justice; federal, state, or local law enforcement officers; employees of private security companies to provide courtroom security for the Federal judiciary; or other persons as designated by the United States Associate Attorney General.

Title 28 USC Chapter 37 § 564 authorizes United States Marshals, deputy marshals and such other officials of the Service as may be designated by the Director, in executing the laws of the United States within a State, to exercise the same powers which a sheriff of the State may exercise in executing the laws thereof.

Except for suits by incarcerated persons, non-prisoner litigants proceeding in forma pauperis, or (in some circumstances) by seamen, U.S. Marshals no longer serve leading process or subpoenas in private civil actions filed in the U.S. district courts. Under the Federal Rules of Civil Procedure, process may be served by any U.S. citizen over the age of 18 who is not a party involved in the case. The Marshals still levy executions and serve writs of garnishment.

Witness Protection Program

A chief responsibility of the Marshals is the United States Federal Witness Protection Program.

Justice for Victims of Trafficking Act of 2015
TITLE VI—STOPPING EXPLOITATION THROUGH TRAFFICKING
(Sec. 605) This section amends the federal judicial code to authorize the United States Marshals Service to assist state, local, tribal, and other federal law enforcement agencies, upon request, in locating and recovering missing children. The JVTA establish The Missing Child Unit (MCU) of USMS

Fugitive programs
The Marshals Service publicizes the names of wanted persons it places on the list of U.S. Marshals 15 Most Wanted Fugitives, which is similar to and sometimes overlaps the FBI Ten Most Wanted Fugitives list or the Bureau of Alcohol, Tobacco, Firearms, and Explosives Most Wanted List, depending on jurisdiction.

The 15 Most Wanted Fugitive Program was established in 1983 in an effort to prioritize the investigation and apprehension of high-profile offenders who are considered to be some of the country's most dangerous fugitives. These offenders tend to be career criminals with histories of violence or whose instant offense(s) pose a significant threat to public safety. Current and past fugitives in this program include murderers, sex offenders, major drug kingpins, organized crime figures, and individuals wanted for high-profile financial crimes.

The Major Case Fugitive Program was established in 1985 in an effort to supplement the successful 15 Most Wanted Fugitive Program. Much like the 15 Most Wanted Fugitive Program, the Major Case Fugitive Program prioritizes the investigation and apprehension of high-profile offenders who are considered to be some of the country's most dangerous individuals. All escapes from custody are automatically elevated to Major Case status.

The Wall Street Journal reported on November 14, 2014 that the Marshals Service's Technical Operations Group utilizes a so-called dirtbox to track fugitives.

Special Operations Group
The Special Operations Group (SOG) was created in 1971, and is the Marshals Service's tactical unit. It is a self-supporting response team capable of responding to emergencies anywhere in the U.S. or its territories. 

Most of the deputy marshals who have volunteered to be SOG members serve as full-time deputies in Marshals Service offices throughout the nation, and they remain on call 24 hours a day. The SOG also maintains a small, full-time operational cadre stationed at the Marshals Service Tactical Operations Center at Camp Beauregard, Louisiana, where all deputies undergo extensive, specialized training in tactics and weaponry.

Deputies must meet rigorous physical and mental standards. The group's missions include: apprehending fugitives, protecting dignitaries, providing court security, transporting high-profile and dangerous prisoners, providing witness security, and seizing assets.

Office of Protective Operations 

The Office of Protective Operations (OPO) is the United States Marshals Service's preeminent expert on physical protection. OPO provides subject matter expertise, guidance, and direct action support to district offices on high-threat/-profile proceedings and risk-/threat-based protective operations. The footprint is national, covering all twelve federal judicial circuits across the country, with the ability to project globally.

Currently, the OPO is responsible for two permanent risk-based protection details for the Deputy Attorney General (DAG) and the Secretary of Education (SecEd), respectively.

These Senior Inspectors routinely deploy across the U.S. and around the globe to protect the DAG and Secretary of Education. They lead security for nominees to the U.S. Supreme Court through the pendency of the nomination, which are often fraught with threats of violence and protests. They also provide security for sitting U.S. Supreme Court Justices, when those Justices are farther than 50 miles from Washington, D.C., where the U.S. Supreme Court Police have statutory protection authority. As a result, they develop a deep expertise in protective operations and partner extensively with the U.S. Secret Service, Diplomatic Security Service, along with local, state, federal, and foreign law enforcement and security agencies.

In 2019, the Trump administration investigated the feasibility of shifting protective responsibility for many government officials to the U.S. Marshals.

Training and equipment

Training
Marshals Service hiring is competitive and comparable to the selection process for Special Agent positions in sister agencies. Typically fewer than five percent of qualified applicants are hired  and must possess at a minimum a four-year bachelor's degree or competitive work experience (which is usually three or more years at a local or state police department). While the USMS's hiring process is not entirely public, applicants must pass a written test, an oral board interview, an extensive background investigation, a medical examination and drug test, and multiple Fitness In Total (FIT) exams to be selected for training. Deputy U.S. Marshals complete a 19-week training program at the U.S. Department of Homeland Security's Federal Law Enforcement Training Center in Glynco, Georgia.

Firearms and protective gear

The primary handgun for marshals are Glock pistols in .40 S&W caliber (models 22, 23 or 27). Deputy Marshals may also carry a backup gun, but it must meet certain requirements. Deputy Marshals are also equipped with body armor and collapsible batons for daily use, and ballistic shields, helmets, and protective goggles for serving high risk warrants.

Members of the U.S. Marshal SOG Teams are armed with Beretta 9mm pistols, Smith & Wesson Model 645 .45 cal pistols, .357 magnum revolvers, Remington 870 and Ithaca DS 12-gauge shotguns, Colt 9mm SMGs with Knight's Armament Company suppressors, HK MP-5 9mm SMGs, M16A2 and CAR-15 rifles, and Remington 700 .308 cal rifles equipped with scopes.

In 2019, the SOG adopted the STI 2011, a 1911 platform of pistol that is modified for USMS SOG needs.

Surveillance airplanes
The U.S. Marshals Service has planes registered under a front company named Early Detection Alarm Systems, which has an address of a UPS Store mailbox in Spring, Texas. This operation has been in place since at least 2007, and by 2014 were based in five airports across the country.

The planes tend to fly in a tight circle; GPS/radio trackers, cameras, video recorder, and video transmitter installations are documented. It is also presumed to include an IMSI-catcher such as the Stingray phone tracker or the Boeing DRTbox (Dirtbox), which are used by the Marshals' Technical Operations Group.

 Observed locations of U.S. Marshals planes
 Mexico states of Sinaloa and Durango during April–May, July, and November 2017, including during the capture of a Sinaloa Cartel member in El Dorado, Sinaloa on May 1, 2017
 Guatemala
 Carver Shores, Orlando, Florida, January 2017

Organization

The Marshals Service is based in Arlington, Virginia, and, under the authority of the Attorney General, is headed by a director, who is assisted by a deputy director. The Director is supervised by the Deputy Attorney General. The Marshals Service headquarters provides command, control, and cooperation for the disparate elements of the service.

Headquarters
 Director of the U.S. Marshals Service
 Chief of Staff
 Office of General Counsel
 Office of Equal Employment Opportunity
 Deputy Director of the U.S. Marshals Service
 Chief of District Affairs
 Office of Professional Responsibility
 Associate Director for Operations
 Judicial Security Division
Office of Protective Operations
Deputy Attorney General's Protection Detail
Secretary of Education's Protection Detail
 Investigative Operations Division
 Witness Security Division
 Tactical Operations Division
 Prisoner Operations Division
 Justice Prisoner and Alien Transportation System
 Chief Financial Officer
 Financial Services Division
 Associate Director for Administration
 Training Division
 Human Resources Division
 Information Technology Division
 Office of Public and Congressional Affairs
 Management Support Division
 Asset Forfeiture Division

Federal judicial districts
The U.S. court system is divided into 94 federal judicial districts, each with a district court (except the territory of Guam and the Commonwealth of the Northern Mariana Islands, which share a U.S. Marshal). For each district there is a presidentially-appointed and Senate-confirmed United States marshal, a Chief Deputy U.S. Marshal (GS-14 or 15) (and an Assistant Chief Deputy U.S. Marshal in certain larger districts), Supervisory Deputy U.S. Marshals (GS-13), and as many deputy U.S. Marshals (GS-7 and above) and special deputy U.S. Marshals as needed. In the United States federal budget for 2005, funds for 3,067 deputy marshals and criminal investigators were provided. The U.S. Marshal for each United States courts of appeals (the 13 circuit courts) is the U.S. Marshal in whose district that court is physically located.

The director and each United States Marshal are appointed by the President of the United States and subject to confirmation by the U.S. Senate. The District U.S. Marshal is traditionally appointed from a list of qualified law enforcement personnel for that district or state. Each state has at least one district, while several larger states have three or more.

Personnel

Titles
Agency executives
 The director (Ronald L. Davis): originally titled the Chief United States Marshal, overall head of the USMS and overseer of the Marshals.
 The deputy director (Roberto Robinson): principal deputy and first in line of succession to the director.

Marshals
 United States Marshal: the top executive of the Marshals Service in each of the 94 federal judicial districts, appointed by the president subject to confirmation by the senate
 Chief Deputy United States Marshal: the senior career manager for the federal judicial district who is responsible for management of the Marshals office and staff
 Supervisory Deputy United States Marshal, responsible for the supervision of three or more deputy U.S. Marshals and clerks
 Deputy United States Marshal: for all nonsupervisory positions

Deputy Marshals
Deputy U.S. Marshals start their careers at the GS-7 pay grade. After the first year in grade, they are promoted to GS-9, the following year GS-11, the following year GS-12.  Once deputies reach the GS-11 pay grade, they are reclassified as 1811 Criminal Investigators. Criminal Investigators work additional hours and receive an additional 25% Law Enforcement Availability Pay on top of their base pay.

Duties performed include criminal investigations, execution of warrants, and other investigative operations. They also protect government officials, process seized assets of crime rings for investigative agencies, and relocate and arrange new identities for federal witnesses in the United States Federal Witness Protection Program, which is headed by the USMS. After Congress passed the Adam Walsh Act, the U.S. Marshals Service was chosen to head the new federal sex offender tracking and prosecution hot team.

Special Deputy Marshals
The Director of the United States Marshals Service is authorized to deputize the following persons to perform the functions of a Deputy U.S. Marshal in any district designated by the Director:
 Selected officers or employees of the Department of Justice;
 Selected federal, state, or local law enforcement officers whenever the law enforcement needs of the U.S. Marshals Service so require;
 Selected employees of private security companies in providing courtroom security for the Federal judiciary;
 Other persons designated by the Associate Attorney General pursuant to 28 CFR 0.19(a)(3).

Coast Guard as Deputy Marshals
Under Title 14 USC 634(b) in the United States Coast Guard, "Commissioned officers may be appointed as United States Deputy Marshals in Alaska."

Court Security Officers
Court Security Officers (CSOs) are contracted former law enforcement officers who receive limited deputations as armed Special Deputy Marshals and play a role in courthouse security. Using security screening systems, Court Security Officers attempt to detect and intercept weapons and other prohibited items that individuals attempt to bring into federal courthouses. There are more than 5,000 Court Security Officers with certified law enforcement experience deployed at more than 400 federal court facilities in the United States and its territories.

Detention Enforcement Officers
DEOs (1802s) are responsible for the care of prisoners in USMS custody. They also are tasked with the responsibility of conducting administrative remedies for the U.S. Marshal. DEOs can be seen transporting, booking and securing federal prisoners while in USMS custody. They also provide courtroom safety and cell block security.

Detention enforcement officers are deputized and fully commissioned federal law enforcement officers by the U.S. Marshal. They are authorized to carry firearms and conduct all official business on behalf of the agency. Not all districts employ detention enforcement officers.

Inspectors
The Marshal Service has the positions of Inspector, Senior Inspector and Chief Inspector, depending on the duties and position to which a Deputy Marshal has been assigned to.
This title was created for promotions within the service usually for senior non-supervisory personnel. Senior Deputy Marshals assigned to regional fugitive task forces or working in special assignments requiring highly skilled criminal investigators often receive the title Inspector. Operational non-supervisory employees assigned to the Witness Protection Program are given the title Senior Inspector. Deputy Marshals assigned to The Organized Crime Drug Enforcement Task Force (OCDETF) department within the USMS also hold the title of Senior Inspector. Senior Inspectors receive a GS-13 pay grade level.

Line-of-duty deaths
More than 200 U.S. Marshals, deputy marshals, and special deputy marshals have been killed in the line of duty since Marshal Robert Forsyth was shot dead by an intended recipient of court papers in Augusta, Georgia, on January 11, 1794. He was the first U.S. federal law enforcement officer to be killed in the line of duty. The dead are remembered on an Honor Roll permanently displayed at Headquarters.

Notable marshals and deputy marshals

 Nathaniel P. Banks (1816–1894) U.S. Marshal for Massachusetts 1879-1888
 Jesse D. Bright (1812–1875), U.S. Marshal for Indiana; later served as U.S. senator for that state
 Seth Bullock (1849–1919), businessman, rancher, sheriff for Montana, sheriff of Deadwood, South Dakota, U.S. Marshal of South Dakota
 John F. Clark, U.S. Marshals Service Director and U.S. Marshal for the Eastern District of Virginia
 Charles Francis Colcord (1859–1934), rancher, businessman and U.S Marshal for Oklahoma
 Phoebe Couzins (1839–1913), lawyer, first woman appointed to the U.S. Marshals
 Henry Dearborn (1751–1829), U.S. Marshal for the District of Maine
 Frederick Douglass (1818–1895), former slave and noted abolitionist leader, appointed U.S. Marshal for the District of Columbia in 1877
 Morgan Earp (1851–1882), Deputy U.S. Marshal, Tombstone, Arizona, appointed by his brother Wyatt
 Virgil Earp (1843–1905), Deputy U.S. Marshal, Tombstone, Arizona
 Wyatt Earp (1848–1929), Deputy U.S. Marshal (appointed to his brother Virgil Earp's place by the Arizona Territorial Governor)
 Frank Eaton (1860–1958), Deputy U.S. Marshal for Judge Isaac C. Parker, author, cowboy, scout, Indian fighter, and mascot for Oklahoma State University ("Pistol Pete")
 Richard Griffith (1814–1862), Brigadier General for the Confederacy during the Civil War
 Wild Bill Hickok (1837–1876), noted Western lawman; served as a Deputy U.S. Marshal at Fort Riley, Kansas 1867–1869
 Ward Hill Lamon (1826–1893), friend, and frequent bodyguard of President Abraham Lincoln, who appointed him U.S. Marshal for the District of Columbia
 J. J. McAlester (1842–1920), U.S. Marshal for Indian Territory (1893–1897), Confederate Army captain, merchant in and founder of McAlester, Oklahoma as well as the developer of the coal mining industry in eastern Oklahoma, one of three members of the first Oklahoma Corporation Commission (1907–1911) and the second Lieutenant Governor of Oklahoma (1911–1915)
 Benjamin McCulloch (1811–1862), U.S. Marshal for Eastern District of Texas; became a brigadier general in the army of the Confederate States during the American Civil War
 Henry Eustace McCulloch (1816–1895), U.S. Marshal for Eastern District of Texas. Brother of Benjamin McCulloch; also a Confederate General
 James J. P. McShane (1909–1968), appointed U.S. Marshal for the District of Columbia by President John F. Kennedy then named chief marshal in 1962
 John W. Marshall, U.S. Marshal for the Eastern District of Virginia (1994–1999), first African-American to serve as Director of the U.S. Marshals Service (1999–2001)
 Bat Masterson (1853–1921), noted Western lawman; deputy to U.S. Marshal for Southern District of New York, appointed by Theodore Roosevelt
 Joseph Meek (1810–1875), territorial marshal for Oregon
 Thomas Morris (1771–1849), U.S. Marshal for New York District
 David Neagle (1847–1925), shot former Chief Justice of California David S. Terry to protect US Supreme Court Justice Stephen Johnson Field, resulting in U.S. Supreme Court decision In re Neagle
 John L. Pascucci (1948–present), former Chief of International Operations for the U.S. Marshals Service and author of The Manhunter: The Astounding True Story of the U.S. Marshal Who Tracked Down the World's Most Evil Criminals. Charged with extortion in 1989.
 Bob Pavlak (1924–1994), U.S. Marshal for the District of Minnesota and Minnesota legislator
 Henry Massey Rector (1816–1899), U.S. Marshal for Arkansas, later governor of that state
 Bass Reeves (July 1838 – January 1910) is thought by most to be one of the first Black men to receive a commission as a Deputy U.S. Marshal west of the Mississippi River. Before he retired from federal service in 1907, Reeves had arrested over 3,000 felons.
 Porter Rockwell (c.1813–1878), Deputy U.S. Marshal for Utah
 William Stephens Smith (1755–1816), 1789 U.S. Marshal for New York district and son-in-law of President John Adams
 Dallas Stoudenmire (1845–1882), successful city marshal who tamed and controlled the remote, wild and violent town of El Paso, Texas; became U.S. Marshal serving West Texas and New Mexico Territory just before his death
 Heck Thomas (1850–1912), Bill Tilghman (1854–1924), and Chris Madsen (1851–1944), the legendarily fearless "Three Guardsmen" of the Oklahoma Territory
 William F. Wheeler (1824–1894), U.S. Marshal for the Montana Territory
 Cal Whitson (1845–1926), one-eyed Deputy U.S. Marshal for the Oklahoma Territory; served as the basis for the character Rooster Cogburn of the novel and films True Grit
 James E. Williams (1930–1999), U.S. Marshal for South Carolina, Medal of Honor recipient

Criticism and controversy

Inspector General audits
An audit by the Office of Inspector General (OIG) (November 2010) of the Justice Department found "weaknesses in the USMS's efforts to secure federal court facilities in the six USMS district offices we visited". The report found, among other things, that the Marshals Service's Judicial Security Division had contracted private security firms to provide Court Security Officers without having completed background checks. Another incident involved the Marshals Service awarding a $300 million contract to a security guard company named USProtect Corporation, which had a known history of numerous criminal activities leading to convictions for mail fraud and bank fraud and false insurance claims in addition to a civil judgment against its chief financial officer. Technical problems included court security officers not being properly trained on security screening equipment, which also meant equipment not being used. The OIG noted that in February 2009, several courthouses failed to detect mock explosives sent by Marshals Service Headquarters in order to test security procedures. They also found that 18% of court security officers had outdated firearms qualifications.

Internal thefts
On March 26, 2009, the body of Deputy U.S. Marshal Vincent Bustamante was discovered in Juárez, Mexico, according to the Marshals Service. Bustamante, who was accused of stealing and pawning government property, was a fugitive from the law at the time of his death. Chihuahua State Police said the body had multiple wounds to the head apparently consistent with an execution-style shooting.

In January 2007, Deputy U.S. Marshal John Thomas Ambrose was charged with theft of Justice Department property, disclosure of confidential information, and lying to federal agents during an investigation. Deputy Ambrose had been in charge of protecting mobster-turned-informant Nicholas Calabrese, who was instrumental in sending three mob bosses to prison for life. A federal jury convicted Ambrose on April 27, 2009, of leaking secret government information concerning Calabrese to William Guide, a family friend and former Chicago police officer who had also served time in prison for corruption. Ambrose also was convicted of theft of government property but acquitted of lying to federal agents. On October 27, 2009, Ambrose was sentenced to serve four years in prison.

Racial discrimination
In 1998, retired Chief Deputy U.S. Marshal Matthew Fogg won a landmark EEO and Title VII racial discrimination and retaliation lawsuit against the Justice Department, for which he was awarded $4 million. The jury found the entire Marshals Service to be a "racially hostile environment" which discriminates against black employees in its promotion practices. U.S. District Judge Thomas Penfield Jackson summarized the jurors' decision by stating that they felt there was an "atmosphere of racial disharmony and mistrust within the United States Marshal Service". As of 2011, Fogg is president of "Bigots with Badges", and executive director of CARCLE (Congress Against Racism and Corruption in Law Enforcement), and is also associated with Law Enforcement Against Prohibition (LEAP), a drug law reform organization of law enforcement officers.

Ruby Ridge
The Department of Justice under Janet Reno acknowledged wrongdoing in U.S. marshals decisions surrounding a firefight at Ruby Ridge in 1992, where a deputy U.S. marshal shot 14-year-old Samuel Weaver in the back. Afterwards, deputy U.S. marshals became involved in a gunfight with Weaver's father, who was wanted on a federal warrant for failure to appear, and another person. Deputy United States marshals dispute this claim. Deputy U.S. marshal Billy Deegan was killed during a surveillance operation after identifying himself as a federal agent. This led to an extended gunfight in which both sides fired several rounds. Samuel Weaver was shot and killed. His body was taken to a small building for more than a week and an autopsy was unable to determine entry and exit wounds (see Idaho Federal Court Transcripts for clarification of this incident). Newsweek described the incident as "one of the most shameful episodes in the history of American law enforcement".

In popular culture

 Deputy Marshal Raylan Givens stars in the modern western crime TV series Justified, based on an Elmore Leonard story.
 Deputy Marshal Karen Sisco stars in the crime comedy film Out of Sight, and a spin-off crime drama TV series, Karen Sisco. The character, created by Elmore Leonard, also appeared in a season 3 episode of Justified.
 Deputy Marshal Matt Dillon stars in the Western drama radio and television series Gunsmoke.
 Deputy Marshal Mary Shannon stars in the crime drama TV series In Plain Sight 
 Deputy Marshal "Rooster" Cogburn stars in the western drama films True Grit (1969), Rooster Cogburn and True Grit (2010)
 Deputy Marshals Wyatt Earp and his brothers Virgil and Morgan, all based on real life U.S. Marshals, star in the western drama film Tombstone, one of many films and TV shows to star the Earp brothers, that also include Newton, James and Warren Earp. Another such film is the biographical western drama Wyatt Earp, which cast most of the Earp family and followed Wyatt and his brothers from their childhood on their parent's farm to adulthood and becoming lawmen.
 Deputy Marshal J.D. Cahill stars in the western drama film Cahill U.S. Marshal.
 Supervisory Deputy U.S. Marshal Samuel Gerard stars in the action thriller films The Fugitive, and its spin-off U.S. Marshals 
 Deputy Marshal Winston MacBride stars in the action drama series The Marshal, as a lone marshal pursuing fugitives across the country.
 Deputy Marshal Vince Larkin stars in the action film Con Air, which largely takes place aboard a hijacked Marshal Service prisoner transport plane, nicknamed "Con Air".
 Deputy Marshal Annie Frost stars alongside a group of Marshals out of Houston who form the Fugitive Apprehension Team on the drama series Chase.
 A team of Deputy Marshals star in the action comedy TV series Eagleheart
 Deputy Marshal Cameron Burke was a main character in the game Far Cry 5.

See also
 Federal law enforcement in the United States
 Law enforcement in the United States

References

Further reading
 Ball, Larry D. The United States Marshals of New Mexico and Arizona Territories, 1846-19121509
 Ball, Larry D. "'Just And Right In Every Particular': US Marshal Zan Tidball and the Politics of Frontier Law Enforcement." Journal of Arizona History 34.2 (1993): 177–200.
 Calhoun, Frederick S., and US Dept of Justice. The Lawmen: United States Marshals and their Deputies (Smithsonian Press, 1989). online
 Ellis, Mark R. Law and order in Buffalo Bill's country: legal culture and community on the Great Plains, 1867-1910 (U of Nebraska Press, 2007).
 Gomez, Laura E. "Race, colonialism, and criminal law: Mexicans and the American criminal justice system in territorial New Mexico." Law and Society Review (2000): 1129–1202.
 Lamar, Howard R. The New Encyclopedia of the American West (1998) p 678–79.
 Turk, David S. Forging the Star: The Official Modern History of the United States Marshals Service (U of North Texas Press),7000.

External links

 
 U.S. Marshals Service Office of Public Affairs Official Flickr account
 Court Security Program  includes role in CSOs
 Authority of FBI agents, serving as special deputy United States marshals, to pursue non-federal fugitives
 Deputization of Members of Congress as special deputy U.S. marshals
 USC on the U.S. Marshals Service 
 Retired US Marshals Association
 U.S. Diplomatic Security Service (DSS)
 Stacia Hylton Director of U.S. Marshals Service 12/23/10 to 6/9/15
 United States Code 14 U.S.C. § 634 "Officers holding certain offices"

United States Marshals Service
1789 establishments in the United States
Court security
Federal law enforcement agencies of the United States
United States Department of Justice agencies